Kira Kelly is an American cinematographer. She is perhaps best known for her work on 13th, which earned her an Emmy Award nomination, and the cable series Queen Sugar.

Career
Kelly is a graduate of Northwestern University with a major in Radio/Television/Film. Her professional film career began as an electrician. In a 2017 interview on the public radio series The Frame, she indicated that she would also "shoot any project I could get my hands on."

She also learned a lot from working as a gaffer on bigger budget projects. Her early work as a cinematographer included two features directed by Tom Gustafson and the Hulu series East Los High.

A big break in her career occurred when Ava DuVernay reached out to her through social media. This eventually led to Kelly being hired to work on 13th, for which she received an Emmy Award nomination.

Influences
Kelly is influenced by the work of Rinko Kawauchi, Martina Hoogland Ivanow, and Cy Twombly.

Selected filmography

Film

Television

Awards and recognition
 Nominated – Emmy Award for 13th

References

External links

 

American cinematographers
Northwestern University alumni
Living people
African-American cinematographers
Year of birth missing (living people)
21st-century African-American people